Sylvio Kelly dos Santos (15 July 1935 – 4 November 2016) was a Brazilian sportsman. He competed in two Olympics. He represented Brazil in swimming at the 1952 and 1956 Olympics and in water polo at the 1959 Pan American Games.

He was brother of Márvio dos Santos, who participated at three Summer Olympics in Water Polo.

At the 1952 Summer Olympics in Helsinki, he swam the 1500-metre and the 4×200-metre freestyle, not reaching the final.

At the 1956 Summer Olympics in Melbourne, he swam the 400-metre freestyle, not reaching the final.

At the 1959 Pan American Games in Chicago, he won the bronze medal in the Water Polo.

He broke the Brazilian record in the 1500-metre freestyle, in Helsinki at the 1952 Summer Olympics.

References

External links 
 
 

1935 births
2016 deaths
Brazilian male freestyle swimmers
Brazilian male water polo players
Swimmers at the 1952 Summer Olympics
Swimmers at the 1956 Summer Olympics
Olympic swimmers of Brazil
Pan American Games bronze medalists for Brazil
Pan American Games medalists in water polo
Competitors at the 1959 Pan American Games
Medalists at the 1959 Pan American Games
20th-century Brazilian people